Fernand David (18 October 1869, Annemasse, Haute-Savoie – 17 January 1935) was the French Minister of Agriculture from 21 January 1913 to 22 March 1913.

References

1869 births
1935 deaths
People from Annemasse
Politicians from Auvergne-Rhône-Alpes
Democratic Republican Alliance politicians
Independent Radical politicians
French Ministers of Agriculture
Transport ministers of France
French Ministers of Commerce and Industry
Members of the 7th Chamber of Deputies of the French Third Republic
Members of the 8th Chamber of Deputies of the French Third Republic
Members of the 9th Chamber of Deputies of the French Third Republic
Members of the 10th Chamber of Deputies of the French Third Republic
Members of the 11th Chamber of Deputies of the French Third Republic
French Senators of the Third Republic
Senators of Haute-Savoie
Grand Crosses of the Order of Saint-Charles